Abercrombie Plan may refer to any one of a number of urban planning proposals written or co-written by Sir Leslie Patrick Abercrombie, including:

County of London Plan (1943, with John Henry Forshaw)
Greater London Plan (1944)
A Plan for the City & County of Kingston upon Hull (1945, with Sir Edwin Lutyens)
 Abercrombie Plan (Edinburgh) a plan for Edinburgh 
 A Plan for Plymouth (1943)

See also 
Abercrombie (disambiguation)